Xenogenesis may refer to:

 Xenogenesis (film), a 1978 short film by James Cameron
 Xenogenesis, a proposed designation for the process of introducing laboratory-designed genes
 Xenogenesis Trilogy, now published as Lilith's Brood, a collection of three novels by Octavia E. Butler
 Xenogenesis, a comic book from the Aliens comic book series by Dark Horse Comics
 "Xenogenesis", a 2014 song by TheFatRat (also known as “The Outro Song”)